
A fly-whisk (or fly-swish) is a tool that is used to swat flies. A similar gadget is used as a hand fan in hot tropical climates, sometimes as part of regalia, and is called a chowrie, chāmara, or prakirnaka in South Asia and Tibet.

In Indonesian art, a fly-whisk is one of the items that is associated with Shiva. A fly-whisk is frequently seen as an attribute of Hindu, Jain, Daoist and Buddhist deities. The fly-whisk is evident in some configurations of the Ashtamangala, employed in some traditions of murti puja, particularly Gaudiya Vaishnavism. It is also used as an accessory in the ritual aspects of folk performance traditions, especially folk-theater forms like Pala Gaan, where it can double as a prop.

Fly-whisks are in use in parts of the contemporary Middle East, such as Egypt, by some classes of society, e.g., outdoor merchants and shop keepers, especially in summer when flies become bothersome. Those have a wooden handle and plant fibers attached to them. The more expensive ones are made from horse hair. In the eastern parts of the Indian subcontinent, it is made from the tail-hairs of the yak. Yakut people from Siberia use fly-whisk called deybiir made of horse tail both for swating mosquitoes and as a sacred tool for shamanistic rituals.

Fly-whisks appear frequently in the traditional regales of monarchs and nobility in many parts of the African continent. Fly whisks, called "ìrùkẹ̀rẹ̀" in Yoruba, were used by Yoruba monarchs and chiefs as a symbol of power and respect. This use has sometimes carried on into modern contexts: Kenyan leader Jomo Kenyatta carried a fly-whisk, a mark of authority in Maasai society, as did  Malawian leader Hastings Banda, while South African jazz musician Jabu Khanyile also used a Maasai fly-whisk as a trademark when on stage.

The fly-whisk is one of the traditional symbols of Buddhist monastic hierarchy in China and Japan, along with the khakkhara, jewel scepter, and begging bowl. The fly-whisk in Buddhism represents the symbolic "sweeping" of ignorance and mental afflictions. The Daoist fly-whisk is made of the root and twine of the smilax for the handle, and the hairs are made of palm fiber. The Chinese fly-whisk is also used by He Qiong  He Xiangu's lotus flower improves one's health, mental and physical. She is depicted holding a lotus flower, and sometimes with the musical instrument known as sheng, or a fenghuang to accompany her. She may also carry a bamboo ladle  and in many Chinese martial arts such as Shaolin Kung Fu and Wudang quan, each corresponding to their own respective religious philosophy. 

A fly-whisk forms part of the royal regalia of Thailand. It consists of the tail hairs of a white elephant.
Fly-whisks were also used in Polynesian culture as a ceremonial mark of authority.

Algeria incident
In 1827, the last Ottoman ruler of Algeria, Hussein Dey, struck the French consul,  Pierre Deval in the face with a fly-whisk during a dispute over unpaid French debts to Algeria. That insult became a pretext for the French invasion of Algeria in 1830.

Gallery

See also
Hossu: for Buddhist priests
Flyswatter
Feather duster
Whisk
Chamara yoga

References

Pest control techniques
Mechanical hand tools
Regalia
Buddhist ritual implements
Objects used in Hindu worship
Insect control
Flies and humans